Corbis may refer to:
 Corbis Corporation, an American advertising and licensing company, later renamed Branded Entertainment Network
 Corbis, a synonym for the bivalve genus Fimbria